Coleophora elbursella is a moth of the family Coleophoridae.

References

elbursella
Moths described in 1994